Faustina Hasse is the name of one of the following persons:

* Faustina Hasse, born as Faustina Bordoni (1697–1781), Italian mezzo-soprano
 Faustina Hasse Hodges (1822–1895), English-American organist and composer